El amor invencible is a Mexican telenovela that premiered on Las Estrellas on 20 February 2023. The series is produced by Juan Osorio. It is an adaptation of the Portuguese telenovela Mar Salgado, created by Inês Gomes. It stars Angelique Boyer and Danilo Carrera.

Plot 
After losing all her loved ones fifteen years ago and believing her babies were killed at the hands of the father of her first love, Leona Bravo (Angelique Boyer) embarks on a journey of justice against all those who hurt her. In this process, Leona discovers that her children are actually alive and is reunited with an old friend with whom she finds true love. As a result, she will be torn between her desire for justice and rebuilding her bond with her two children, as well as regaining her faith in love.

Cast 
 Angelique Boyer as Marena Ramos / Leona Bravo
 Dalexa as Young Marena
 Danilo Carrera as Adrián Hernández / David Alejo
 Mikel Mateos as Young Adrián
 Leticia Calderón as Josefa
 Daniel Elbittar as Gael Torrenegro
 Daney Mendoza as Young Gael
 Marlene Favela as Columba Villareal
 Guillermo García Cantú as Ramsés Torrenegro
 Arcelia Ramírez as Consuelo
 Gabriela Platas as Camila
 Alejandra Ambrosi as Jacinta
 Víctor González as Calixto
 Luz María Jerez
 Isabella Tena as Ana Julia
 Emiliano González as Benjamín
 Ana Tena as Lola
 Karla Gaytán as Itzel
 Lukas Urkijo as Teo
 Abril Michel as Kika
 Pedro de Tavira as Matías Torrenegro
 Regina Velarde as Flor
 Cinthia Aparicio
 José Daniel Figueroa
 Luis Arturo as Romeo
 Carlos Orozco P.
 Sebastián Guevara
 Mía Fabri
 Juanpa Molina
 Juan Soler as Apolo

Production

Development 
In July 2022, Juan Osorio announced that he had started pre-production on his next telenovela, with the working title being Amor imposible. Filming began on 7 November 2022.

Casting 
In August 2022, Anette Michel was confirmed as part of the cast. On 22 September 2022, it was announced Leticia Calderón had joined the cast. On 7 October 2022, Angelique Boyer and Danilo Carrera were confirmed in the lead roles. On 14 October 2022, Guillermo García Cantú, Luz María Jerez, Marjorie de Sousa, Daniel Elbittar joined the cast in main roles. On 24 October 2022, it was announced that Marlene Favela had joined the cast. On 27 October 2022, it was announced that Marjorie de Sousa and Anette Michel had exited the production. Michel explained that she exited due to the fact that she did not finish shooting a film on time, while de Sousa dropped out because she had not yet finished the filming of El Conde: Amor y honor.

Ratings 
 
}}

Episodes

Notes

References

External links 
 

2023 telenovelas
2023 Mexican television series debuts
2020s Mexican television series
Televisa telenovelas
Mexican telenovelas
Spanish-language telenovelas
Mexican television series based on Portuguese television series